Bajrami is a surname. Notable people with the surname include:

Agron Bajrami (born 1967), journalist of Kosovo Albanian descent
Arta Bajrami (born 1980), Albanian singer
Emir Bajrami (born 1988), Swedish footballer of Kosovo Albanian descent
Muharem Bajrami (born 1985), Macedonian footballer of Albanian descent
Selma Bajrami (born 1980), Bosnian pop-folk and turbo folk singer of Albanian descent
Xhavit Bajrami (born 1975), Albanian-Swiss kickboxer

Albanian-language surnames
Patronymic surnames